Lamington is an unincorporated community and census-designated place (CDP) located within Bedminster Township in Somerset County, New Jersey, United States. It contains the Lamington Presbyterian Church Cemetery and the Lamington Black Cemetery.

Demographics

The name
"Lamington" is a corruption of the Native American word for the nearby stream, the "Allemetunck" or the "Loamatong". Its name means "the place within the hills" or "the place of paint clay." There are 113 recorded variations on the spelling of Lamington, including "Alamatunk," "Lametunk" and "Lamberton."

The church
The Lamington Presbyterian Church was constructed in 1740. Church membership included Scots-Irish Presbyterians, Dutch and German settlers, tenant-farmers, large and small landowners, lawyers, teachers, millers, weavers, tailors, other craftsmen and workmen, slaves and freed blacks.

National Register of Historic Places
The Lamington Historic District, which includes the Presbyterian Church and the Lamington Black Cemetery, was added to the National Register of Historic Places in 1984.

Notable people
People who were born in, residents of, or otherwise closely associated with Lamington include:
 Joseph Caldwell (1773–1835), first President of the University of North Carolina at Chapel Hill.
 John Honeyman (1729–1822), alleged "spy of Washington" during the American Revolutionary War lived the last 30 years of his life in the Lamington area and is buried in the Lamington Presbyterian Church Cemetery (his original gravestone, as well as a document showing his assigned church pew, is exhibited inside the church building).
 Zebulon Pike (1779–1813), brigadier general and early explorer who was the namesake for Pikes Peak, though the explorer is often erroneously said to have been born in Lamberton, a port community that has since been annexed by Trenton in Mercer County.
 Jane McCrea (c. 1752–1777), colonist killed by a Huron-Wendat warrior associated with the British army, whose slaying led to outrage and an increase in Patriot military support.
 John Van Dyke (1807–1878), represented  in the United States House of Representatives from 1847 to 1851.

Notable burials:
 James Linn (1749–1821), a United States Representative from New Jersey who was a member of the Provincial Congress of New Jersey in 1776, served in the Somerset County Militia during the Revolutionary War and is buried in the Lamington Presbyterian Church Cemetery.

References

Bedminster, New Jersey
Census-designated places in Somerset County, New Jersey
Unincorporated communities in Somerset County, New Jersey
Unincorporated communities in New Jersey